

Regular season standings

Playoffs

Semifinals

Relegation NLA - Liga B

Swiss Bowl XXXII 
The Calanda Broncos won their 8th title.

References 

American football in Switzerland